George Coles (christened 19 October 1798 – 22 January 1865) was an English amateur cricketer who played first-class cricket from 1819 to 1820 for Cambridge University Cricket Club.

Coles made only three known appearances in first-class matches but was a very successful bowler using a right-handed underarm style.  In 1820, his tally of 17 was the highest by any first-class bowler that season.

Educated at Eton and Peterhouse, Cambridge, George Coles later became ordained as a Church of England clergyman. He was Vicar of St James, Croydon from 1829 to 1865.

References

External links

1798 births
1865 deaths
English cricketers
English cricketers of 1787 to 1825
Cambridge University cricketers
People educated at Eton College
Alumni of Peterhouse, Cambridge
19th-century English Anglican priests